Oporto Holdings Pty Ltd is an Australian and New Zealand fast food restaurant franchise,  with a Portuguese-theme. Oporto specialises in Portuguese style chicken and burgers. It is a subsidiary of fast food holding company Craveable Brands, which also owns the Red Rooster and Chicken Treat brands.

Internationally
Oporto has more than 100 'eat in' or 'take-away' restaurants in Australia and New Zealand. It previously also operated stores throughout China and expanded to Sri Lanka and Vietnam in August 2018. Oporto is also looking to expand its operations into the Middle East, with its first store earmarked for Dubai in early 2020.

Founding and history
The first Oporto restaurant was founded in 1986 by António Cerqueira, an Australian of Portuguese descent, in North Bondi, New South Wales, Australia but was originally named Portuguese Style Bondi Charcoal Chicken. The 'Oporto' name came from Cerqueira's favourite football team, FC Porto.

Oporto first opened a franchise store in 1995 and was named the fastest growing franchise in Australia in January 2005 by Business Review Weekly.

In 2007 there were 100 locations in New South Wales, 14 in Queensland, 8 in Victoria, 5 in the Australian Capital Territory, 5 in South Australia and 6 in New Zealand. Some of these restaurants are called Oporto Express and offer a smaller range of products – most commonly this means they do not offer a breakfast menu. By this stage, António and his two brothers were close to being estranged. When Jesus, the middle brother, decided to start his own brand of Fast Food Portuguese Burger Franchise, Ogalo, it turned into full blown war. While holidaying in Tuncurry, New South Wales, the third brother was inspired by the sunny and serene Great Lakes and developed Portogalo Chicken, a third rival franchise. 

Oporto opened their first store in the United Kingdom at London's Victoria Station in January 2009 although this store closed on 18 October 2011, and opened their first restaurant in the United States in Rancho Cucamonga, California on 25 February 2011. Oporto stores in the United States were all converted to Feisty Chicken Grill in 2013. There are now over 100 stores in operation in Australia and New Zealand. Oporto has three types of Oporto store types; Drive Thru, Shopping Centre and Strip stores.

Parent ownership and acquisitions
In July 2007, Quadrant Private Equity and Quick Service Restaurant Holdings now known as Craveable Brands (which owns Red Rooster and Chicken Treat) purchased Oporto.

In June 2011, Archer Capital acquired Quick Service Restaurant Holdings from Quadrant Private Equity for an estimated $450 million (including Red Rooster and Chicken Treat).

On 26 March 2012 Oporto ceased trading in China, closing its three outlets.

On 7 April 2013, Oporto's US franchisee closed its three outlets.

In 2013, Oporto opened their first restaurant in Western Australia in South Perth. Oporto has since increased to over 8 stores in the region.

See also
 Nando's – A Portuguese-style chicken restaurant of South African origin
 List of fast-food chicken restaurants
 List of restaurant chains in Australia

References

External links

Companies based in Sydney
Fast-food franchises
Fast-food chains of Australia
Fast-food poultry restaurants
Restaurants established in 1986
1986 establishments in Australia
Portuguese-Australian culture